Maa Annayya Bangaram  is 2010 Andhra Telugu-language drama film, produced by Natti Kumar on Vishaka Talkies banner directed by Jonnalagadda Srinivas. Starring Rajashekar, Kamalini Mukharjee and music composed by SA Raj Kumar.

Cast

Soundtrack

Music composed by SA Raj Kumar. Music released on Shivaranjani Music Company.

References

External links 
 
 about the movie in rottentomatoes 

2010 films
2010s Telugu-language films